SEPR may refer to:

 Société d'Etudes pour la Propulsion par Réaction, French rocket-engine manufacturer
 Sepracor Sepracor, Inc. ( former NASDAQ: SEPR ), pharmaceutical company
United Socialist Party of Russia, Russian political party (abbreviation of Russian name)
Evangelical Seminary of Puerto Rico, Protestant seminary in Puerto Rico (abbreviation of Spanish name)